Yakovenkove, also known as Iakovenkove, is a village in Izium Raion (district) in Kharkiv Oblast of eastern Ukraine, at about  southeast by east (SEbE) from the centre of Kharkiv city, at about  north-northeast (NNE) from the northern border of Balakliia (Balakliya).

The settlement came under attack by Russian forces during the Russian invasion of Ukraine in 2022 and was regained by Ukrainian forces by the beginning of September the same year.

References

Villages in Izium Raion
Izyumsky Uyezd